Foreign direct investments in Morocco grew to $2.57 billion in 2007 from $2.4 billion a year earlier to position the country in the fourth rank in Africa among FDI recipients. Although other studies have shown much higher figures.

Investment by region

Investment from the EU
Most of the FDIs injected in Morocco came from the European Union with France, the major economic partner of the north African kingdom, topping the list with investments worth $1.86 billion, followed by Spain ($783mln), the report said. The influx of European countries in Morocco's FDI represents 73.5% of the global amount received in 2007, according to the report which was presented by Souraya Ouali of the Direction of Investments.

Investment from the Arab World
19.3% of the investments came from Arab countries, whose share in Morocco's FDI showed a marked rise, as they only represented 9.9% of the entire FDIs in 2006.
A number of Arab countries, mainly from the Persian Gulf are involved in large-scale projects in Morocco, including the giant Tanger Med port on the Mediterranean. Morocco remains the preferred destination of foreign investors in the Maghreb region (Algeria, Libya, Mauritania, Morocco and Tunisia), with a total of $13.6mln between 2001 and 2007, which puts it largely on the top of the list.

The Persian Gulf countries are investing heavily in Morocco, particularly in tourism and real estate. Construction is evident everywhere. These investments reflect the strong diplomatic relations between Morocco and the regimes in the Persian Gulf countries. Some analysts would add the Sunni affinity as another factor, but above all, it is the liberalized economy and the economic reforms in Morocco that appear to be attracting most of the investors from the Persian Gulf region.

The trend of heavy Persian Gulf investments in Morocco came in the wake of 9/11, when GCC countries began to invest more in the Arab world. Due to the oil prices, which climbed about 400% in eight years, member countries of the GCC (Saudi Arabia, United Arab Emirates, Qatar, Bahrain, and Oman) accumulated considerable liquidity that has triggered the drive for diversification.

United Arab Emirates 
The United Arab Emirates (UAE) has been a major player in Morocco's development. While early investments were primarily in construction and tourism, recent investments have been directed at newer areas such as information technology, agriculture, transportation, telecommunications, automobile and aviation development. The amount of the investments is becoming of great significance for the Moroccan economy. Analysts estimate that the potential of investment of the Persian Gulf countries is about $500 billion, and Morocco could conceivably attract no less than 20 billion dollars of that amount.

Investment per sector

In terms of sectors, tourism has the lion's share with $1.55 billion, that is 33% of the total FDIs, followed by the real estate sector and the industrial sector, with respectively $930mln and $374mln. Moroccan expatriates' share of the FDI stood at $92mln in 2007, up from $57mln in 2006, and they touch mainly the sectors of real estate, tourism and catering, according to the report.

Recent developments
Expectations for 2008 are promising, noting that 72 projects were approved for a global amount of $9.28 billion. These are due to open 40,023 direct job opportunities. Morocco is also a source of foreign investments. In 2007, it has injected $652mln in projects abroad, which put the kingdom in the third position in Africa, UNCTAD said.

Morocco has become an attractive destination for European investors thanks to its relocation sites "Casashore" and "Rabatshore", and to the very rapid cost escalation in Eastern Europe, Vice chairman of the "Groupe d'impulsion économique France-Maroc" (GIEFM) said in October 2008. He stressed that the offshoring sector in Morocco is of great importance as it creates high-level jobs that are generally accompanied by an influx of Moroccan immigrants. He underlined, however, that human resources remain the major concern for companies seeking to gain a foothold in Morocco. In this regard, he deemed "important" the decision of the Moroccan government to accelerate training in the required disciplines.

Reforms
In a bid to promote foreign investments, Morocco in 2007 adopted a series of measures and legal provisions to simplify procedures and secure appropriate conditions for projects launching and completing. Foreign trade minister, Abdellatif Maazouz cited that these measures include financial incentives and tax exemptions provided for in the investment code and the regional investment centres  established to accompany projects. These measures combined with actions carried out by the Hassan II Fund for Development increased foreign investments in Morocco by $544,7 mln in 2007. With 20% of these investments came from Islamic countries.

See also
Economy of Morocco
Economy of Tangier
Economy of the Arab League
Economy of Casablanca
Casablanca Stock Exchange

References

Economy of Morocco